Stanley Hinds (born 21 March 1951) is a Vincentian cricketer. He played in 36 first-class and 10 List A matches for the Windward Islands from 1974 to 1986.

See also
 List of Windward Islands first-class cricketers

References

External links
 

1951 births
Living people
Saint Vincent and the Grenadines cricketers
Windward Islands cricketers